Kunnakudi Vaidyanathan (2 March 1935 – 8 September 2008) was an Indian classical music violinist and music composer.

Early life
Kunnakudi Vaidyanathan was born on 2 March 1935 and was trained by his father, Ramaswamy Sastry. He was the brother of Kunnakudi Subbalakshmi.

Career
The violin was his forte. He was known for his dexterity and subtlety in handling the violin, he catered not only to the music scholar but also to the layman. His play reflected his own different moods and the demands of his audience with whom he established and enjoyed a good rapport. He dwelled with ease and competence in the high as well as the low octaves.

At the age of 12, he accompanied great stalwarts like Ariyakudi Ramanuja Iyengar, Semmangudi Srinivasa Iyer and Maharajapuram Santhanam in concerts.  He also performed with Nadaswaram vidwans like T.N.Rajarathinam Pillai and Thiruvenkadu Subramania Pillai.

He stopped accompanying vocal artistes in 1976 to concentrate more on solo concerts.  He was famous for his fingering techniques on the violin.  His interest in new attempts and innovations led him to work with veteran thavil vidwan Valayapatti_A._R._Subramaniam. They performed over 3,000 shows together. Vaidyanathan had deep faith in the therapeutic merits of music.

Film music
He also made a significant contribution to Tamil devotional music.  A. P. Nagarajan giving him his first break in the movie Vaa Raja Vaa.  He had several hits such as Agathiyar in which "Sirkazhi govindarajan" Acted as Agathiyar. And Raja Raja Chozhan, for which he scored music, were also phenomenal hits.

Vaidyanathan made a special appearance in the 2005 Tamil movie Anniyan directed by Shankar, on the Tyagaraja Aradhana festival sequence for the song Iyengaaru Veetu which is a recreation of the real festival. He had guest appearances in many other films.

He tried his hand at film production with a feature film in Tamil Thodi Ragam, with T. N. Seshagopalan in the lead, which failed to enthuse the audience.

Discography
Their works include music for the following movies:

Awards
He was awarded the prestigious "Padma Shri" title by the Indian government, Kalaimamani award, Sangeet Natak Akademi Award by the Sangeet Natak Akademi in 1993, and the Karnataka Isaignani award.  He has also won Best Music Director awards for his background scores for films. He received the Sangeetha Kalasikhamani award given by "The Indian Fine Arts Society" in 1996. He also received the Tamil Nadu State Film Award for Best Music Director for the film Thirumalai Thenkumari in 1970 and the Tamil Nadu State Film Honorary Award - Raja Sando Award in 2000.

Other associations
Vaidyanathan, had a long association with the All India Radio. An able administrator, Vaidyanathan served as Secretary of the Tamil Nadu Iyal Isai Nadaga Mandram.  As the Secretary of Thyagabrahma Sabha, Thiruvaiyaru in Thanjavur district, he conducted the Tyagaraja Aradhana for several years.  He also served as president of the Raga Research Centre.

References

External links
 Interview with Kunnakudi Vaidyanathan 

1935 births
2008 deaths
Indian violinists
Carnatic instrumentalists
Carnatic violinists
Recipients of the Padma Shri in arts
Recipients of the Sangeet Natak Akademi Award
Tamil musicians
Tamil Nadu State Film Awards winners
People from Tirunelveli district
Tamil film score composers
Kannada film score composers
20th-century violinists
20th-century Indian musicians